We Are Sent Here by History is a studio album by British-Barbadian musician Shabaka Hutchings, under his band "Shabaka and the Ancestors". It was released on 13 March 2020 under Impulse! Records.

Critical reception
We Are Sent Here by History was met with universal acclaim reviews from critics. At Metacritic, which assigns a weighted average rating out of 100 to reviews from mainstream publications, this release received an average score of 84, based on 11 reviews.

As Rob Shepherd noted for PostGenre: "As much as history may have sent [the band] to this moment in time, one senses future generations will themselves be looking back to this music in forging their own artistic paths."

Track listing

Charts

References

2020 albums
Impulse! Records albums